Professor Siegwart Horst Günther (24 February 1925 in Halle (Saale) – 16 January 2015) was a German physician and activist. He once worked with Albert Schweitzer in Africa.  He was a prominent proponent of the disputed claim that the use of depleted uranium in munitions causes cancers, birth defects and other pathologies.  In 2007 the Nuclear-Free Future Award honored for the third time Prof. Günther for refusing to back down to pressure and for visiting Iraq to study the real-life consequences of depleted uranium use.

See also

Nuclear-Free Future Award
Hartmut Gründler
 The Doctor, the Depleted Uranium, and the Dying Children—An award-winning documentary film produced for German television, streaming on YouTube
An obituary of Günther from the International Coalition to Ban Uranium Weapons Archived by the Wayback Machine 19th March 2015.

References

1925 births
2015 deaths
German anti–nuclear weapons activists
Physicians from Saxony-Anhalt
German activists
People from Halle (Saale)